Avathara Pathi is a phrase in Tamil which represents 'The place where God incarnates'. The Avathara Pathi is one among the holy places of Ayyavazhi,(see: Ayyavazhi Holy Sites) which had been erected in Thiruchendur. Avathara Pathi is located half-a-mile south to the Murugan Temple, at the sea-shore."Makara Theertham" (the primary sea-theertham as per Akilam) is located here.

According to Akilattirattu Ammanai (the holy text of Ayyavazhi) Lord Narayana  incarnated as Ayya Vaikundar and arose from the sea at this place. In honour of this event the Avatharappathi is erected there. This was not included in Panchappathi.

See also

List of Ayyavazhi-related articles

Ayyavazhi